Facial masculinization surgery (FMS) is a set of plastic surgery procedures that can transform the patient’s face to exhibit typical masculine morphology. Cisgender men may elect to undergo these procedures, and in the context of transgender people, FMS is a type of facial gender confirmation surgery (FGCS), which also includes facial feminization surgery (FFS) for transgender women.

FMS can include various bony procedures such as chin augmentation, cheek augmentation, as well as augmentation of the forehead, jaw, and Adam's apple. In FMS, most procedures involve "having structures added to give more angles to the face."

History

Trans men have requested FMS procedures since the 20th century. FMS is currently less common than FFS. Urologist Miriam Hadj-Moussa notes that "transgender men rarely undergo facial masculinization surgery since testosterone therapy leads to growth of facial hair and makes it easier for them to present."

In 2011, Douglas Ousterhout outlined the available FMS procedures, drawing on the work of Paul Tessier. In 2015 Shane Morrison published an overview of all gender confirming surgeries for trans men, including FMS. In 2017, Ousterhout's successor Jordan Deschamps-Braly published a case report on the first female-to-male facial confirmation surgery that included masculinization of the Adam's apple.

According to the World Professional Association for Transgender Health (WPATH), for many transgender men, FMS is considered medically necessary to treat gender dysphoria. Following the WPATH recommendations, several literature reviews and summaries of the state of the art were published in 2017 and 2018.

Surgical procedures
The surgical procedures most frequently performed during FMS often include facial implants and include the following, as outlined in the literature.

Forehead augmentation
The purpose of forehead augmentation is to create a less rounded forehead with a more prominent supraorbital ridge typical of cisgender men. It can be done with a customized implant, a calvarial bone graft, fat grafting, or materials such as bone cement that are molded into shape before they harden. Injectable fillers may also be used as an outpatient procedure.

Jaw augmentation
Orthognathic surgery was first performed for functional reasons in the late 19th century, with cosmetic procedures being improved and refined throughout the 20th century. In facial masculinization surgery, the goal is to create a more robust and square jaw with a sharper mandibular angle. This can be achieved through hydroxyapatite (bone mineral) grafts, which promote new bone growth, or through customized implants.

Chin augmentation
To change the appearance of the jaw, chin augmentation may also be performed. This can consist of chin implants or an osteotomy to make the chin tip appear wider and more prominent.

Adam's apple augmentation
This newer procedure uses an implant made from cartilage taken from the patient’s rib cage to augment the tip of the thyroid cartilage known as the "Adam's apple." It was first performed in 2017.

See also

 List of transgender-related topics
 Transgender

References

External links
 Facial Masculinization Surgery via American Society of Plastic Surgeons

Surgical procedures and techniques
Plastic surgical procedures
Gender-affirming surgery (female-to-male)